Glen Gulutzan (born August 12, 1971) is a Canadian ice hockey coach and former player. He is currently an assistant coach for the Edmonton Oilers.

Playing career
Gulutzan played junior hockey with the Moose Jaw Warriors, Brandon Wheat Kings and Saskatoon Blades of the Western Hockey League from 1986 to 1992. Gulutzan signed with the West Coast Hockey League's Fresno Falcons in 1996. During the 1996–97 campaign, Gulutzan saw short call ups with the Utah Grizzlies and the Las Vegas Thunder of the International Hockey League, while scoring 30 goals and 80 assists in 60 games with Fresno.

Following the 1996–97 season, Gulutzan left North America to play for Finnish team Sport in Mestis, the second-highest hockey league in Finland. Following his short 35-game stint in Finland, Gulutzan returned to Fresno in 1998. Gulutzan would spend his final five years of professional hockey play with Fresno, being named the team's player-assistant in the 2001–02 and 2002–03 seasons and winning the Bruce Taylor Cup as the WCHL playoff champions in 2002.

Coaching career
Gulutzan was head coach and general manager of the ECHL's Las Vegas Wranglers from 2003 to 2009, leading the team to two division championships, one Brabham Cup and an appearance in the Kelly Cup Finals. During the 2005–06 season, Gulutzan was awarded the John Brophy Trophy as the league's best coach and in 2008, Gulutzan's Wranglers became the first team in the ECHL's 20-year history to have three-consecutive 100 point seasons. Gulutzan had been named the head coach of the National Conference All-Star team three-straight years, from 2006 to 2008, tying the ECHL record for most All-Star Game appearances by a coach.

In 2011, Gulutzan became the front runner for the Dallas Stars' head coaching vacancy following the team's dismissal of head coach Marc Crawford at the conclusion of the 2010–11 season and was named the head coach on June 16, 2011. He was relieved of his duties on May 14, 2013.

On July 24, 2013, it was announced that Gulutzan would be an assistant coach for the Vancouver Canucks.

On June 17, 2016, Gulutzan was announced as the new head coach of the Calgary Flames following the dismissal of Bob Hartley. On April 17, 2018, the Flames fired Gulutzan after the team missed the playoffs.

On May 25, 2018, Gulutzan was announced as an assistant coach of Edmonton Oilers.

Career statistics

Playing career

Coaching career

NHL coaching record

Minor league coaching record

References

External links

1971 births
Living people
Brandon Wheat Kings players
Calgary Flames coaches
Canadian ice hockey centres
Dallas Stars coaches
ECHL coaches
Edmonton Oilers coaches
Fresno Falcons players
Ice hockey people from Manitoba
Las Vegas Thunder players
Las Vegas Wranglers
Moose Jaw Warriors players
People from The Pas
Saskatchewan Huskies ice hockey players
Saskatoon Blades players
Utah Grizzlies (IHL) players
Vaasan Sport players
Vancouver Canucks coaches
HC Vita Hästen players
Yorkton Terriers players
Canadian expatriate ice hockey players in Finland
Canadian expatriate ice hockey players in the United States
Canadian ice hockey coaches